Leopold Philip de Heister (4 April 1716 Homberg in Niederhessen - 19 November 1777 Hesse-Cassel) was a Hessian general who fought for the British during the American Revolution.

Heister was a crippled veteran of many campaigns when he was selected to command the Hessian troops that were hired by the British government for service against the American colonies. Wilhelm von Knyphausen served under him as second-in-command. He landed on Long Island near New Utrecht with two full Hessian brigades on 25 August 1776, three days after the arrival of Gen. William Howe with the British troops. The tedious passage of thirteen weeks from Spithead had tried him sorely: “his patience and tobacco had become exhausted. He called for hock, and swallowed large potations to the health of his friends.” 

Soon after debarking, the invading army prepared for marching, the Hessians under De Heister forming the centre, or main body. They cannonaded the works at Flatbush Pass (today Battle Pass), and De Heister ordered Count Donop to storm the redoubt, while he pressed forward with his troops. “Our Hessians and our brave Highlanders gave no quarter,” wrote a British officer, “and it was a fine sight to see with what alacrity they despatched the rebels with their bayonets, after we surrounded them so they could not resist.” Heister also commanded the Hessians at White Plains, 28 October 1776. He was removed from service in 1776 after the Battle of Trenton.

See also

Germans in the American Revolution

Notes

References

Attribution
 

1707 births
1777 deaths
Hessian military personnel of the American Revolutionary War
German generals
Military personnel from Hesse